The Harness Horse of the Year is an honor recognizing the top harness racing horse in the United States. The award is selected by the United States Trotting Association and the United States Harness Writers Association (USHWA), which issues the annual Dan Patch Awards.

The inaugural honor was awarded to Victory Song of Castleton Farms Stables, named the "Harness Horse of 1947" by a committee that consisted of 50 harness racing writers, radio commentators, and sports editors. Victory Song picked up 23 first-place votes, to lead a field of 22 horses that had been nominated for the honor, edging stablemate Hoot Mon, which finished second in the balloting. Victory Song had set the harness racing record for stallions with a time of 1:57.6 in the mile. E. Roland Harriman, president of the Trotting Horse Club of America, announced the award and indicated that the enthusiasm shown for the honor led to the decision to make the "Harness Horse of the Year" an annual event.

Good Time became the first horse to win the honor two times, winning in both 1949 and 1952. Good Time held the single-season money record at the time of $110,299 and received 80 first-place votes from the 99 writers participating in that year's balloting, after finishing first in 23 starts in 1952, with three second-place finishes and two finishes in third.

In 1956, Scott Frost became the first horse to win the Harness of the Year honors in consecutive years, earning the first place on the ballots of 66 of the 95 writers participating that year. Driven by Joe O'Brien, Scott Frost won 18 of 21 starts in 1956, and came in second in the three other races.

In 2022, Bulldog Hanover became the first unanimous choice for Horse of the Year, receiving all 136 votes, after a season in which he became the fastest harness horse in history with a mile of 1:45.4 at The Meadowlands and won nine major stakes races. He also became the third horse to win the Stanley F. Bergstein Proximity- Achievement Award, the highest honor voted on by USHWA.

Past winners
Horses that have been recognized as Harness Horse of the Year are:

References

Harness Horse of the Year winners
Horse racing awards
American horse racing awards